Milan Vuković (1933 - 16 March 2018), was a Croatian jurist, president of the Supreme Court of Croatia and judge of the Constitutional Court of Croatia.

Biography 
Vuković was born in a peasant family in Krilo near Split. He graduated at the Classical gymnasium in Split in 1952 and at the Faculty of Law, University of Zagreb in 1956. After a two-year military service as a reserve officer, he worked in a Secretariat of Justice and Public Administration. He finished his law practice in Zagreb in 1960 and became a lawyer in 1961. He was a member of the League of Communists of Yugoslavia.

Vuković was elected judge of the  Constitutional Court of Croatia for the first time in 1991, and later again both in 1995 and 1999. He was twice president of the Supreme Court of Croatia (1992–1995, 1997–1999). He was one of the members of the Constituent Assembly, responsible for writing Croatian Constitution in 1990, as well as member of the Commission for war crimes (1993–1995) and State Judicial Council of Croatia (1994-1995).

He is recipient of the Order of Ante Starčević, Order of Duke Trpimir and Homeland War Memorial Medal.

References 

1933 births
2018 deaths
Lawyers from Split, Croatia
Croatian lawyers
Croatian judges
Order of Ante Starčević recipients
Order of Duke Trpimir recipients
Burials at Mirogoj Cemetery